Roger L. Hanson (November 11, 1925 – January 3, 2005) was an American businessman and politician.

Born in Pelican Rapids, Minnesota, Hanson went to Dakota Business College and was in the retail hardware and heating and plumbing business in Vergas, Minnesota. He served in the Minnesota House of Representatives from 1969 to 1972 as a Republican and then in the Minnesota State Senate from 1973 to 1976.

Notes

1925 births
2005 deaths
People from Pelican Rapids, Minnesota
Businesspeople from Minnesota
Republican Party members of the Minnesota House of Representatives
Republican Party Minnesota state senators
20th-century American politicians
20th-century American businesspeople